Harvey Shapiro is a college baseball coach, and former manager of the Netherlands national baseball team and the Bourne Braves. He is currently head coach of the Wareham Gatemen of the Cape Cod Baseball League.

Biography
A native of New Britain, Connecticut, Shapiro played college baseball for the University of Connecticut under coach Larry Panciera. He graduated from UConn in 1970 with a degree in accounting, and received a master's degree in physical education from Springfield College in 1975.

Shapiro was an assistant baseball coach at Springfield under coach Archie Allen in the late 1970s and early 1980s, and also served as the school's head women's basketball coach in 1976–1977 and again from 1980 to 1983, compiling a 65–27 record over four seasons on the Springfield hardwood. He became head baseball coach at Bowdoin College in 1984 and remained at that post for 15 seasons through 1998, simultaneously leading Bowdoin's women's basketball program as head coach for the same period. While at Bowdoin, Shapiro also served as manager of the Netherlands national baseball team from 1984 to 1986, leading the club to multiple appearances in the Baseball World Cup. He became head baseball coach at the University of Hartford in 1999 and led the team for six seasons through 2004.

Shapiro's long association with the Cape Cod Baseball League (CCBL) began in the late 1980s with assistant coaching jobs with the Yarmouth-Dennis Red Sox and Wareham Gatemen. He went on to skipper the Falmouth Commodores from 1994 to 1998, winning the league's coach of the year honors in 1996. Shapiro took the helm of the Bourne Braves in 2003, a post where he remained through 2021. At Bourne, he coached dozens of future major league stars such as Pete Alonso, Mitch Moreland and Tommy La Stella, and led the club to its first league championship in 2009. Following the 2021 season, Shapiro left Bourne to return to Wareham as field manager. Shapiro was inducted into the CCBL's Hall of Fame as part of its 2020 class.

Shapiro was inducted into the Maine Baseball Hall of Fame in 2019.

Head coaching records
The following is a table of Shapiro's yearly records as an NCAA head baseball coach.

References

Living people
Date of birth missing (living people)
Bowdoin Polar Bears baseball coaches
Cape Cod Baseball League coaches
Hartford Hawks baseball coaches
Springfield College (Massachusetts)
UConn Huskies baseball players
People from New Britain, Connecticut
Baseball players from Connecticut
Baseball coaches from Connecticut
Year of birth missing (living people)